Eyre is a given name. Notable people with the name include:

Eyre Coote (East India Company officer) (1726–1783), Irish soldier
Eyre Coote (British Army officer) (1760–1823), Irish soldier, nephew of the above
Eyre Crowe (1864-1925), British diplomat
Eyre Crowe (painter) (1824-1910), British author and painter
Eyre Evans Crowe (1799-1868), British journalist and historian
Eyre Massey Shaw (1830-1908), Superintendent of London Fire Brigade